From Occident to Orient is a 2007 compilation by English folk/rock singer-songwriter Roy Harper. It was initially released as a collectors item by Vinyl Japan to coincide with Harpers 2007 tour there.

Track listing
All tracks credited to Roy Harper
"Blackpool" – 5:09 (from Sophisticated Beggar) 
"Francesca" – 1:21 (from Flat Baroque and Berserk)
"Another Day" – 4:01 (from Flashes from the Archives of Oblivion)
"Miles Remains" – 9:15 (from Beyond the Door)
"Wishing Well" – 5:53 (from The Green Man)
"Frozen Moment" – 3:17 (from Whatever Happened to Jugula?) 
"How Does It Feel" – 6:13 (from Beyond the Door)
"Pinches Of Salt" – 3:06 (from Garden of Uranium)
"Elizabeth" – 6:38 (from Whatever Happened to Jugula?) 
"Rushing Camelot" – 8:47 (from The Green Man)
"The Green Man" – 5:31 (from The Green Man)
"One Of Those Days In England" – 19:13 (from Bullinamingvase)

Personnel 
Roy Harper
 Danny Clifford – cover photography

External links 
Roy Harper Official Site
Excellent Roy Harper resource

Roy Harper (singer) compilation albums
2007 compilation albums